Naarda xanthonephra is a species of moth in the family Erebidae first described by Alfred Jefferis Turner in 1908. It is found in Australia.

A second species with the same name was described by George Hampson in 1910 from Zambia. No replacement name had been attributed to this one by now.

References

Herminiinae
Moths described in 1908